Strathcona South was a provincial electoral district in Alberta, Canada, mandated to return a single member to the Legislative Assembly of Alberta using the first past the post method of voting from 1967 to 1971.

History
The district was created in 1967 out of the southern part of Strathcona East.

In 1971 the district was split between Edmonton-Avonmore and Edmonton-Ottewell.

Election results

1967 general election

See also
List of Alberta provincial electoral districts

References

Further reading

External links
Elections Alberta
The Legislative Assembly of Alberta

Former provincial electoral districts of Alberta
Politics of Edmonton